The Korn Ferry Tour Finals is a series of three golf tournaments that serve as a means of earning PGA Tour membership for the following season ("Tour cards"). The series, which until 2019 consisted of four tournaments, replaced the PGA Tour Qualifying Tournament in 2013.

The Finals take place after the Korn Ferry Tour regular season. In total, fifty players earn cards: the top 25 players on the regular-season standings (known as "The 25") and the top 25 players on the Finals standings (known as the "Finals 25"). From 2013 to 2018, the standings were based on money earned. Since 2019, the standings are based on a points system similar to the FedEx Cup on the PGA Tour.

The initial PGA Tour priority ranking of the 50 graduates is determined by alternating members of The 25 (ordered by their total points, including the Finals) with members of the Finals 25 (ordered by their earnings in the Finals); however, they are re-ordered, or reshuffled, based on their position in the FedEx Cup several times throughout the PGA Tour season. The member of The 25 with the most combined points and the player with the most points in the Finals (even if he is a regular-season graduate) are both exempt from reshuffles and remain at the top of the graduate priority rankings; this is also true of any players who won three times in the Korn Ferry Tour season.

Tournaments
From 2013 to 2015 the Finals consisted of the following four tournaments:
Hotel Fitness Championship in Fort Wayne, Indiana
Small Business Connection Championship in Davidson, North Carolina
Nationwide Children's Hospital Championship in Columbus, Ohio
Web.com Tour Championship in Ponte Vedra Beach, Florida

In 2016, the DAP Championship and the Albertsons Boise Open replaced the Hotel Fitness Championship and Small Business Connection Championship. This lineup remained through 2018, though the order of the tournaments changed.

Beginning in 2019, only three tournaments will be played in the Finals with the DAP Championship being eliminated.

Each event has a purse of US$1,000,000 (the 2013 purses for other tournaments range from $550,000 to $800,000 with a median purse of $650,000). They feature a 36-hole cut of the top-60 and ties (standard Korn Ferry Tour cut). Until 2022, the first three events were worth a minimum of 16 points for the Official World Golf Ranking (OWGR), up from 14 points for regular season Korn Ferry Tour events. The Korn Ferry Tour Championship was worth a minimum of 20 points as the Tour's flagship event, as in the past. Following changes in the OWGR calculations in 2022, there are no fixed minimum points.

Qualification
There are four ways to qualify for the Finals:
Finish in the top-75 on the Korn Ferry Tour's regular season standings (money list from 2013 to 2018, points from 2019).
Finish the PGA Tour's regular season ranked 126–200 on the FedEx Cup points list. Not all players with this criterion will compete, as some are already exempt through other means.
As a non-member of the PGA Tour, earn enough FedEx Cup points to place 126–200 on the points list.
Special medical exemptions.

Tour cards
In 2013, the top-25 on the regular season Web.com Tour money list were guaranteed PGA Tour cards regardless of their performance in the Finals and the Finals determine their priority ranking. Money earned in the four Finals events determined the remaining 25 PGA Tour cards. The leading money winners on the regular season Web.com Tour money list and the Finals money list were fully exempt on the PGA Tour; the remaining 48 players were ranked for PGA Tour priority purposes based on their Finals earnings. In addition, the money leaders in both the regular season and the Finals received places in the following year's Players Championship.

In 2014 the determination of the priority ranking changed. The top 25 from the regular season money list carried their earnings to the Finals, competing among themselves for priority. The top 25 earners in the Finals only, not including the top 25 from the regular season, again earned PGA Tour cards. The priority rankings were then determined be a "zipper method" with the top 25 in combined regular and Finals earnings taking rankings 1, 3, 5, ... and the top 25 from the Finals taking rankings 2, 4, 6, ...

Those who win their third event of the season during the finals are also fully exempt on the PGA Tour. Players who finish in the top 50 on the Finals list and Top 75 on the regular season standings also are guaranteed full Korn Ferry Tour status for the next season. The remainder will either attempt to regain their cards through Korn Ferry Tour Qualifying School or make use of limited PGA Tour status if available.

Criticism
One unintended consequence of the change in Q school is that more amateurs are turning professional earlier in the year (June instead of August) in order to have a better chance at earning a PGA Tour card through high finishes via sponsors' exemptions.

Winners

Tournament winners

*Tournament canceled due to Hurricane Matthew

Money/points leaders

Bolded golfers received full exemptions for the PGA Tour not subject to re-order. In 2013, golfers who led the regular season money list and the Finals money list received full exemptions. Since 2014, golfers who led the overall money list and the Finals money list received full exemptions. Points replaced money beginning in 2019.

References

External links

Korn Ferry Tour